The group stage of the 2007 CAF Champions League was played from 22 July to 2 September 2007. A total of eight teams competed in the group stage, the group winners and runners-up advance to the Knockout stage playing semifinal rounds before the final.

Format
In the group stage, each group was played on a home-and-away round-robin basis. The winners and the runners-up of each group advanced to the Knockout stage.

Groups

Group A

Group B

References

External links
2007 CAF Champions League - todor66.com

Group stage